Garakh is a rural locality (a selo) and the administrative centre of Garakhsky Selsoviet, Magaramkentsky District, Republic of Dagestan, Russia. The population was 362 as of 2010. There are 4 streets.

Geography 
Garakh is located 219 km southeast of Makhachkala, on the Samur River. Maka-Kazmalyar is the nearest rural locality.

Nationalities 
Lezgins live there.

References 

Rural localities in Magaramkentsky District